Shangri-La is a fictional place in Asia's Kunlun Mountains (昆仑山), described in the 1933 novel Lost Horizon by English author James Hilton. Hilton portrays Shangri-La as a mystical, harmonious valley, gently guided from a lamasery, enclosed in the western end of the Kunlun Mountains. Shangri-La has become synonymous with any earthly paradise, particularly a mythical Himalayan utopia – an enduringly happy land, isolated from the world. In the novel, the people who live in Shangri-La are almost immortal, living hundreds of years beyond the normal lifespan and only very slowly aging in appearance.

Ancient  Tibetan scriptures mention the existence of seven such places as Nghe-Beyul Khembalung. Khembalung is one of several Utopia beyuls (hidden lands similar to Shangri-La) which  Tibetan Buddhists believe that Padmasambhava established in the 9th century CE as idyllic, sacred places of refuge for Buddhists during times of strife.

Possible sources for Hilton 
In a New York Times interview in 1936, Hilton states that he used "Tibetan material" from the British Museum, particularly the travelogue of two French priests, Évariste Régis Huc and Joseph Gabet, to provide the Tibetan cultural and Buddhist spiritual inspiration for Shangri-La. Their famous travelogue, first published in French in 1850, went through many editions in many languages. A popular "condensed translation" was published in the United Kingdom in 1928.

Current claimants 
Hilton visited the Hunza Valley, presently located in the Pakistani-administered territory of Gilgit−Baltistan, close to the China–Pakistan border, a few years before Lost Horizon was published; hence it is a popularly believed inspiration for Hilton's physical description of Shangri-La. Being an isolated green valley surrounded by mountains, enclosed on the western end of the Himalayas, it closely matches the description in the novel; although in a reversal on the story, due to increased exposure to ultraviolet radiation, inhabitants of the high-altitude parts of the valley appear to age quickly.

Today various places, such as parts of southern Kham in northwestern Yunnan province, including the tourist destinations of Lijiang and Zhongdian, claim the title. In 2001, Zhongdian County in northwestern Yunnan officially renamed itself Shangri-La County, Xiānggélǐlā in Chinese (香格里拉).

Recent searches and documentaries 
American explorers Ted Vaill and Peter Klika visited the Muli area of southern Sichuan Province in 1999, and claimed that the Muli monastery in this remote region was the model for James Hilton's Shangri-La, which they thought Hilton learned about from articles on this area in several National Geographic magazines in the late 1920s and early 1930s written by Austrian-American explorer Joseph Rock.  Vaill completed a film based on their research, "Finding Shangri-La", which debuted at the Cannes Film Festival in 2007. However, Michael McRae unearthed an obscure James Hilton interview from a New York Times gossip column in which he reveals that his cultural inspiration for Shangri-La, if it is anywhere, is more than 250 km north of Muli on the route travelled by Huc and Gabet.

Between 2002–2004 a series of expeditions were led by author and film maker Laurence Brahm in western China which determined that the Shangri-La mythical location in Hilton's book Lost Horizon was based on references to northern Yunnan Province from articles published by National Geographic's first resident explorer Joseph Rock.

On 2 December 2010, OPB televised one of Martin Yan's Hidden China episodes, "Life in Shangri-La", in which Yan said that "Shangri-La" is the actual name of a real town in the hilly and mountainous region in northwestern Yunnan Province, frequented by both Han and Tibetan locals. Martin Yan visited arts and craft shops and local farmers as they harvested crops, and sampled their cuisine.

Television presenter and historian Michael Wood, in the "Shangri-La" episode of the BBC documentary series In Search of Myths and Heroes, suggests that the legendary Shangri-La is the abandoned city of Tsaparang in upper Satluj valley of Ladakh in India, and that its two great temples were once home to the kings of Guge in modern Tibet.

The Travel Channel in 2016 aired two episodes of Expedition Unknown that followed host Josh Gates to Lo Manthang, Nepal and its surrounding areas, including the sky caves found there, in search of Shangri-La. His findings offer no proof that Shangri-La is or was real.

See also

 List of mythological places
 Xanadu
 Shambhala

References

Citations

Sources 
 Allen, Charles. (1999). The Search for Shangri-La: A Journey into Tibetan History. Little, Brown and Company (UK). . Reprinted by Abacus, London. 2000. .
 Reinhard, Johan (1978) Khembalung: The Hidden Valley. Kailash, A Journal of Himalayan Studies 6(1): 5–35, Kathmandu. PDF
 Wood, Michael (2005) Michael Wood: In search of Myths and Heroes: Shangri-La PBS Educational Broadcasting Company
 Mother Love Bone single "This is Shangri-La" (1990)

External links

 www.LostHorizon.org - information about the book, movie, and real life Shangri-Las

 
Fictional Asian countries
Fictional elements introduced in 1933
Fictional populated places in China
Fictional valleys
Life extension
Mythological kingdoms, empires, and countries
Tibet in fiction
Utopian fiction